The Ramp may refer to:

 The Ramp (Antarctica)
 The Ramp (Alaska), United States

See also
 Ramp (disambiguation)